Sordet is a surname. Notable people with the surname include:

André Sordet (1852–1923), French Commandeur of the Légion d'honneur
Caroline Sophie Sordet-Boissonnas (1859–1943), Swiss painter
Clément Sordet (born 1992), French golfer